Campania Sound is a sound on the North Coast of British Columbia, Canada, located between Campania Island and Princess Royal Island.  It was named in association with Campania Island.

References

Sounds of British Columbia
North Coast of British Columbia
Spanish history in the Pacific Northwest